Tyler County is a county located in the U.S. state of Texas. It is in East Texas and its seat is Woodville. 

As of the 2020 census, its population was 19,798.

Tyler County is named for John Tyler, the 10th President of the United States. Despite its name, Tyler County does not contain the city of Tyler, Texas; the latter is located about 140 miles to the north in Smith County.

Geography

Major highways
  U.S. Highway 69
  U.S. Highway 190
  U.S. Highway 287
  Recreational Road 255

Adjacent counties
 Angelina County (north)
 Jasper County (east)
 Hardin County (south)
 Polk County (west)

National protected area
 Big Thicket National Preserve (part)

Demographics

Note: the US Census treats Hispanic/Latino as an ethnic category. This table excludes Latinos from the racial categories and assigns them to a separate category. Hispanics/Latinos can be of any race.

As of the census of 2000,  20,871 people, 7,775 households, and 5,675 families resided in the county.  The population density was 23 people per square mile (9/km2).  The 10,419 housing units averaged 11 per square mile (4/km2).  The racial makeup of the county was 84.0% White, 12.0% African American, 0.4% Native American, 0.2% Asian, 2.52% from other races, and 1.1% from two or more races.  About 3.6% of the population was Hispanic or Latino of any race.

Of the 7,775 households, 29.7% had children under the age of 18 living with them, 60.1% were married couples living together, 10.0% had a female householder with no husband present, and 27.0% were not families. About 24.3% of all households were made up of individuals, and 12.4% had someone living alone who was 65 years of age or older.  The average household size was 2.5 and the average family size was 2.9.

In the county, the population was distributed as 23.2% under the age of 18, 8.0% from 18 to 24, 27.2% from 25 to 44, 23.8% from 45 to 64, and 17.8% who were 65 years of age or older.  The median age was 39 years. For every 100 females, there were 106.9 males.  For every 100 females age 18 and over, there were 108.2 males.

The median income for a household in the county was $29,808, and for a family was $35,195. Males had a median income of $31,797 versus $19,594 for females. The per capita income for the county was $15,367.  About 12.6% of families and 15.8% of the population were below the poverty line, including 21.0% of those under age 18 and 10.1% of those age 65 or over.

Communities

Cities
 Colmesneil
 Ivanhoe
 Woodville (county seat)

Towns
 Chester

Census-designated places
 Warren
 Wildwood (partly in Hardin County)

Unincorporated areas
 Doucette
 Fred
 Hillister
 Spurger

Politics

United States Congress

Education
School districts:
 Chester Independent School District
 Colmesneil Independent School District
 Spurger Independent School District
 Warren Independent School District
 Woodville Independent School District

The county is in the service area of Angelina College.

See also
 National Register of Historic Places listings in Tyler County, Texas
 Recorded Texas Historic Landmarks in Tyler County
 Allan Shivers Library and Museum

References

External links
 Tyler County government's website
 
 Tyler County, TXGenWeb Focuses on genealogical research in Tyler County.
 Dry counties in Texas
 Tyler County Airport

 
1846 establishments in Texas
Populated places established in 1846